A trademark coexistence agreement is an agreement made by two parties to use a similar trademark for marketing purposes without interfering in each other's enterprises.  Agreements of this nature are often made as parties only require regional use of their trademarks, and therefore other enterprises use of a trademark will not harm their business.  Coexistence agreements can potentially also involve designs, copyrights and even patents.

Purpose

The purpose of a trademark coexistence agreement is that often marks are used by multiple enterprises in "good faith".  The absence of a formal agreement does not undermine any enterprise using the mark as they are in different global regions.  However, as the enterprises grow, overlaps can develop, and both parties can have substantial rights for using the trademark.  In certain cases, companies who are expanding and using the same or a similar trademark usually enter in a coexistence agreement for the purpose of avoiding usage of the trademark in a way which is undesirable or infringing.  Coexistence agreements can offer practical solutions to companies who are concerned about being sued for trademark infringement, as proactive agreements can avoid the large cost of litigation.

Formal agreement

A formal trademark coexistence agreement recognises the rights of both parties to use the trademarks contained in the agreement for marketing purposes.  The agreement can contain a division of regions in which enterprises party to the agreement may use the trademark, methods in which the trademark may be used, or classes of goods and services that the trademark may be used for (in conjunction with the Madrid System for the International Registration of Marks).

Content

A trademark coexistence agreement should clearly contain: any parties to the agreement, the specified trademarks or logos which are to coexist, an understanding as to which domain names each party is using, a list of areas and geographical areas that the trademarks or logos where coexistence is allowed and not allowed, and any relevant plans for the expansion of the enterprise.  Additionally, the coexistence agreement should contain the start and end dates of the agreement, a clause establishing the jurisdiction of the agreement and a dispute resolution clause.

Public interest and antitrust regulations

Public interest must be considered when entering into a trademark coexistence agreement.  This often applies in situations such as if two medical companies bore the same trademark for unique products, as this could lead to confusion and have serious impacts on consumers.  Companies must also consider antitrust regulations.  Courts may find that similar trademarks may affect competition in the marketplace.

References

Trademark law